Charles II (died in Louvre in 1521) was Count of Nevers (1506–1521). He was son of Engelbert de La Mark and Charlotte de Bourbon-Vendome.

He belongs to the House de La Mark. His father Engelbert, Count of Nevers (1491–1506) was son of John I, Duke of Cleves (1384–1404) and Elisabeth Countess of Nevers. Elisabeth was great-granddaughter of Philip II duke of Burgundy.

Charles II succeeded his father in 1506. He married in 1504 to Marie d'Albret, Countess of Rethel, daughter of Jean d'Albret and Charlotte Countess of Rethel. Thus he became Count of Rethel jure uxoris. They had:
 Francis I 1516–1561, Duke of Nevers (1521–1561)

References

Sources

1521 deaths
Year of birth missing
House of La Marck
16th-century French people
16th-century monarchs in Europe
16th-century peers of France
Charles 02